Graeme Telford (born 19 March 1942) is an Australian archer. He competed in the men's individual event at the 1972 Summer Olympics.

References

1942 births
Living people
Australian male archers
Olympic archers of Australia
Archers at the 1972 Summer Olympics
Place of birth missing (living people)